Deer Run is an equestrian community in Brevard, Florida, United States known for wildlife. The community began when Cavalier Properties Inc. along with Atico Financial Corp purchased the property July 10, 1980 for the sum of $2,715,000. The development was officially completed on January 27, 1983.  The community was platted thereafter with 560 lots over 2.5 square miles. There are currently 493 land parcels, as some parcels have been combined. As of 2018 about 147 of the parcels have been developed.  Deer Run Community park features a community building, tennis court, and equestrian ring.

Geography

Deer Run is located at  (27.8675029, -80.6607306).

History 

The community which later became Deer Run began as a citrus grove. Development of the area began in the early 1980s with the first home owners building in 1983.

References

Populated places in Brevard County, Florida
1980 establishments in Florida
Populated places established in 1980